Piyal Kashyapa Wijetunge (born August 6, 1971, Badulla) is a former Sri Lankan cricketer who played in one Test in 1993. Though he was not successful in the international arena, he was an active member in the domestic arena, where he played 65 first class matches and took 161 wickets as well.

He has served as a spin bowling coach for the Sri Lanka national team, where he trained international players such as Rangana Herath, Tharindu Kaushal and Dilruwan Perera.

See also
 One-Test wonder

References

1971 births
Living people
Sri Lanka Test cricketers
Sri Lankan cricketers
Sinhalese Sports Club cricketers
Kandurata cricketers
Alumni of St. Anthony's College, Kandy
Bloomfield Cricket and Athletic Club cricketers